The following is a list of FCC-licensed radio stations in the U.S. state of North Carolina, which can be sorted by their call signs, frequencies, cities of license, licensees, and programming formats.

List of radio stations

Defunct
 WBIG
 WCRY
 WGIV
 WGSB
 WGTL
 WGTM (Spindale, North Carolina)
 WGTM (Wilson, North Carolina)
 WJBX
 WJOS
 WJPI
 WLTT
 WMBL
 WOOW
 WPTP-LP
 WQNX
 WRDK
 WSPF
 WTOW
 WTRQ
 WVBS
 WVOT
 WVSP
 WWIL
 WWNG

See also
 North Carolina media
 List of newspapers in North Carolina
 List of television stations in North Carolina
 Media of cities in North Carolina: Asheville, Charlotte, Durham, Fayetteville, Greensboro, High Point, Raleigh, Wilmington, Winston-Salem

References

Bibliography

External links

  (Directory ceased in 2017)
 North Carolina Association of Broadcasters
 Asheville Radio Museum (est. 2001)
 Carolinas Chapter of the Antique Wireless Association

Images

 
North Carolina